Grand Le Pierre is a town in the Canadian province of Newfoundland and Labrador. The town had a population of 176 in the Canada 2021 Census.

History
During the 1990s, The council of Grand Le Pierre, Led by Mayor George fizzard, conceived a plan to establish a water bottling plant in the town, the plant would receive runoff water from Gisborne Lake, located within the town's area boundary, and then exported through a facility that was planned to be built in the town's harbour. Newfoundland's Premier at the time, Brian Tobin, first approved this plan, but later retracted his approval, disallowing the project to continue, this decision sparked outrage in the community, as it was expected that 150 jobs were to become available if the plant was established. No considerations of reviving this been project has been made in the years since its termination.

Demographics 

See also
 List of cities and towns in Newfoundland and Labrador

References

Towns in Newfoundland and Labrador